Antônio Francisco Braga (April 15, 1868 – March 14, 1945) was a Brazilian music composer. Braga was born in Rio de Janeiro, and studied with Luiz António de Moura and Carlos de Mesquita. In 1886, he founded the Sociedade de Concertos Populares. As the Brazilian Republic was declared in 1889, his composition Hino à bandeira was adopted as the Brazilian national anthem. Starting in 1890 Antônio Francisco Braga studied at the Conservatoire in Paris with Jules Massenet. After that he spent time both in Germany and in Italy and then returned to Brazil in 1900. Upon his return to Brazil, Antônio Francisco Braga taught at the Instituto Nacional de Música and was the conductor of the Sociedade de Concertos Sinfonicos between 1908 and 1933. One of his pupils was Brazilian pianist and composer Cacilda Borges Barbosa.

Antônio Francisco Braga composed three operas and produced orchestral pieces, chamber music, piano pieces and many songs.

Works
Missa de S. Francisco Xavier (s.d.)
Missa de S. Sebastião (s.d.)
Te Deum (s.d.)
Stabat Mater (s.d.)
Trezena de S. Francisco de Paula (s.d.)
A Paz, poem with chorus (s.d.)
Oração pela Pátria, poem with chorus (s.d.)
Trio, para piano, violin e cello (s.d.)
  Dois Quintetos (s.d.)
Quarteto for woodwind and brasses (s.d.)
Virgens Mortas, song with lyrics by Olavo Bilac (s.d.)
Trovador do Sertão, for voice and band (s.d.)
Hino à juventude brasileira (s.d.)
Hino à Paz (s.d.)
Paysage (1895)
Cauchemar (1896)
Brasil, marcha (1898)
Marabá, symphonic poem, first work dedicated to Brazil (1898)
Episódio Sinfônico (1898)
Jupira, opera (1898)
A Pastoral, lyric episode (1903)
Hino à Bandeira Nacional (1905)
Canto de Outono, for string orchestra (1908)
O Contratador de Diamantes, incidental music (1908)
Insônia, symphonic poem (1908)
Anita Garibaldi, opera (1912–1922)
Many military marches, like Barão do Rio Branco, Satanás and Dragões da Independência

References

External links
 

1868 births
1945 deaths
Brazilian classical composers
Brazilian opera composers
Conservatoire de Paris alumni
Male classical composers
Male opera composers
19th-century Brazilian male musicians
20th-century Brazilian musicians
20th-century male musicians